String Theory is a 2021 album by the band A Flock Of Seagulls. It is the band's seventh album and the second that follows an orchestral line that began with its predecessor Ascension in 2018. It was recorded at Tokyorama Studio in Ljubljana, Slovenia and Loop Studio in Trieste, Italy.

History 
The album brings another part of the group's songs from their first three albums and the band's fifth album, once again featuring a partnership between the original members of the band, some guest musicians and the Slovenian Symphonic Film Orchestra. It was announced on the group's social media on May 10, 2021 and has as its lead single the song ''Say You Love Me'', a song that originally came from the group's fifth album The Light at the End of the World in 1995.

In an interview with vocalist Mike Score, it was revealed that this album came after a request from the record company to choose which new songs would be featured on this new compilation of orchestral songs. As with Ascension, the orchestral arrangements do not deviate from the originals but serve to "[give] them a new vibe."

The promotional video was recorded by August Day Records with dancers as well as the band's vocalist, the single was released on July 1, 2021. The album was officially released on August 20, 2021, on digital platforms such as Deezer, Spotify and also in physical versions that are sold on Amazon and on the band's and record label's own website.

Track listing

Personnel 
Credits adapted from the liner notes of String Theory.

A Flock of Seagulls

 Mike Score – vocals, guitar, keyboards
 Sare Havlicek – keyboards
 Paul Reynolds, Slava Voroshnin – lead guitar
 Frank Maudsley, Slava Voroshnin, Denis Susin – bass
 Ali Score, Charlie Pine – drums

Additional personnel

 John Bryan, Sare Havlicek – production
 Slava Voroshnin, Sare Havlicek – programming
 Pete Whitfield, John Bryan, Sare Havlicek – orchestral arrangements
 Sare Havlicek – mixing
 Eugene – mastering
 William P, Rich Elson – artwork

References 

A Flock of Seagulls albums
2021 albums
Collaborative albums
August Day Recordings albums